Anthony John Brown (born 17 September 1958) is an English former footballer who played as a centre-back. He played in the Football League with Leeds United, Doncaster Rovers, Scunthorpe United and Rochdale

Career
Born in Bradford, Brown played for Northern Counties East League side Thackley before signing for Leeds United in March 1983. Brown made 24 appearances for Leeds before joining Doncaster Rovers on loan in November 1984, before the deal was made permanent in March 1985. Brown joined Scunthorpe United in 1989 and Rochdale in 1989 before retiring from League football in 1993. He subsequently played for Bradford (Park Avenue).

Brown was appointed as manager of Eccleshill United in May 2002.

References

External links
 

1958 births
Living people
English footballers
English football managers
Footballers from Bradford
Association football central defenders
Thackley A.F.C. players
Leeds United F.C. players
Doncaster Rovers F.C. players
Scunthorpe United F.C. players
Rochdale A.F.C. players
Bradford (Park Avenue) A.F.C. players
Eccleshill United F.C. managers
Football managers from Yorkshire
English Football League players